Sean Karani (born December 14, 2000) is an American professional soccer player who plays for Temple Owls.

Career
Karani played with United Soccer League side Swope Park Rangers during their 2018 season from Sporting Kansas City's academy. He made his first professional appearance on June 2, 2018, as a 75th-minute substitute during a 2–0 loss to Saint Louis FC.

In September 2019, Karani began to play college soccer at Temple University.

References

External links 
 Sporting KC profile
 

2000 births
Living people
American soccer players
Sporting Kansas City II players
Association football forwards
Soccer players from Wichita, Kansas
USL Championship players
USL League Two players
Temple Owls men's soccer players
American people of Kenyan descent
Treasure Coast Tritons players